Agno railway station is a railway station in the municipality of Agno in the Swiss canton of Ticino. The station is on the metre gauge Lugano–Ponte Tresa railway (FLP), between Lugano and Ponte Tresa.

Agno is the nearest station to Lugano Airport, and is a sign-posted 10-minute walk from the airport terminal.

The headquarters and main depot of the FLP adjoins the station. The station has a passing loop, although trains do not usually pass here in normal service. There is a single side platform which adjoins the station building, and a narrow centre platform allows passengers to board and alight from trains on the loop track.

The station was renovated and expanded between 1990 and 1992, and further work, including the enlargement of the centre platform, was undertaken in 2003.

Services 
 the following services stop at Agno:

Gallery

References

External links 
 
 

Agno
Ferrovie Luganesi stations